Ivanovskaya is a rural locality (a village) and the administrative center of Ivanovskoye Rural Settlement, Vashkinsky District, Vologda Oblast, Russia. The population was 267 as of 2002. There are 4 streets.

Geography 
Ivanovskaya is located 48 km north of Lipin Bor (the district's administrative centre) by road. Savalikha is the nearest rural locality.

References 

Rural localities in Vashkinsky District